Jason Roach may refer to:

 Jason Roach (baseball) (born 1976), former Major League Baseball pitcher
 Jason Roach (rugby league) (born 1971), rugby league footballer
 Jason Roach (curler) (born 1984), curler